Allen Mercantile Company is a historic retail trade building at 102 Main Street in Climax, Georgia. It was added to the National Register of Historic Places in 2002.  It was then one of only two surviving historic commercial buildings on Main Street.

The historic Department Store building was constructed in 1903 in a Victorian architecture and Italianate architecture style.

See also
National Register of Historic Places listings in Decatur County, Georgia

References

Buildings and structures in Decatur County, Georgia
Commercial buildings on the National Register of Historic Places in Georgia (U.S. state)
Victorian architecture in Georgia (U.S. state)
Italianate architecture in Georgia (U.S. state)
Department stores on the National Register of Historic Places